Guijar Islet is an island locality in the Torres Strait Island Region, Queensland, Australia. It consists solely of Poll Island (also known as Guijar Islet).

Guijar Islet's postcode is 4875.

References 

Torres Strait Island Region
Localities in Queensland